San Mango sul Calore is a village and comune in the province of Avellino, in the Campania region of southern Italy.

Geography
It is east of Naples and north of Salerno, about twenty kilometers from the city of Avellino.  Nearby, Monte Tuoro is covered with dense forest, where asparagus and a variety of mushrooms such as porcini, black truffles, ovuli and chiodini abound. 

The comune is bordered by Castelvetere sul Calore, Chiusano di San Domenico, Lapio, Luogosano, Paternopoli and Taurasi.

History
Ponte Romano ("Roman Bridge"), also known locally as Ponte del Diavolo or Ponte di Annibale, is the oldest man-made structure in San Mango, built in about 100 BC. The bridge is composed of bricks, mortar and cobblestone taken from the Calore river that flows beneath it. It was part of the old Napoletana road that passed by the Sant'Anna chapel, curving down to the Calore River. The road eventually met with the Appian Way, the ancient Roman road  that ran from Rome to Brindisi.
 
Ellis Island records indicate that the United States received immigrants from San Mango as early as in 1896.

San Mango sul Calore was completely destroyed by the 1980 Irpinia earthquake. The re-construction was led by the creation of a set of houses known as Villagio Canadese or Canadian Village. It was named after the fund-raising efforts from Italo-Canadians.

References

Cities and towns in Campania